Elmer Le Roy "Butch" Nieman (February 8, 1918 – November 2, 1993) was a Major League Baseball outfielder who played for the Boston Braves from 1943 to 1945.  He played collegiately at Kansas State University from 1938–1939.  He was a native of Herkimer, Kansas.

Nieman is one of many ballplayers who only appeared in the major leagues during World War II.  He was a regular for Boston during much of his three years with the team.  He finished in the league's TOP TEN for triples in 1943, for home runs in 1944, and for at bats per home run in 1945.

Career totals include 332 games played, 269 hits, 37 home runs, 167 RBI, 147 runs, a .256 batting average, and a slugging percentage of .432.  He was a slightly below average defensive outfielder for his era, and in his 317 appearances had a fielding percentage of .961.  One defensive highlight was 13 assists in 1944.

Nieman died at the age of 75 in Topeka, Kansas.

External links
, or SABR Biography Project

1918 births
1993 deaths
Baseball players from Kansas
Boston Braves players
Canton Terriers players
Elmira Pioneers players
Greensboro Red Sox players
Indianapolis Indians players
Little Rock Travelers players
Major League Baseball left fielders
Kansas State Wildcats baseball players
People from Marshall County, Kansas
Scranton Red Sox players
Topeka Owls players